Giorgia Lo Bue (born 20 February 1994) is an Italian lightweight rower. She competes with her sister Serena in the lightweight pair event, and at the 2018 World Rowing Championships in Plovdiv, Bulgaria, they became world champions.

References

1994 births
Living people
Italian female rowers
World Rowing Championships medalists for Italy